Beverly is an unincorporated community in Hitchcock County, in the U.S. state of Nebraska.

History
A post office was established at Beverly in 1881, and remained in operation until 1945. The community was named after Beverly, Massachusetts.

References

Unincorporated communities in Hitchcock County, Nebraska
Unincorporated communities in Nebraska